Choi Kang-hee may refer to:

 Choi Kang-hee (footballer) (born 1959), South Korean footballer
 Choi Kang-hee (actress) (born 1977), South Korean actress